Pekic is a surname. Notable people with the surname include:

Damir Pekič (born 1979), Slovenian football player
Sofija Pekić (born 1953), Serbian basketball player
Petar Pekić (1896–1965), Croatian historian
Borislav Pekić (1930–1992), Serbian writer and political activist